The pink-backed pelican (Pelecanus rufescens) is a bird of the pelican family. It is a resident breeder in the swamps and shallow lakes of Africa and southern Arabia; it has also apparently extirpated in Madagascar.

Taxonomy
The pink-backed pelican was formally described in 1789 by the German naturalist Johann Friedrich Gmelin in his revised and expanded edition of Carl Linnaeus's Systema Naturae. He placed it with the other pelicans in the genus Pelecanus and coined the binomial name Pelecanus  rufescens. Gmelin based his description on the "red-backed pelican" that had been described in 1785 by the English ornithologist John Latham in his multi-volume work A General Synopsis of Birds . Latham had been sent a specimen from West Africa. The specific epithet rufescens is Latin for "reddish". The species is monotypic: no subspecies are recognised.

Description

It is a relatively small pelican, although by no means is it a small bird. The plumage is grey and white, with a pinkish hue on the back occasionally apparent (never in the deep pink of a flamingo). The top of the bill is yellow and the pouch is usually greyish. Breeding adults have long feather plumes on the head.

It shares its habitat with the great white pelican, which is generally larger and has white instead of greyish plumage.

Habitat and breeding
The pink-backed pelican is found in a range of aquatic habitats, but prefers quiet backwaters with shallow water, avoiding steep, vegetated lake banks. It prefers for freshwater lakes, swamps, large slow-flowing rivers, and seasonal pools but also frequents reservoirs, seasonally flooded land and flood-plains near river mouths. It may occur on alkaline and saline lakes and lagoons, and can sometimes be found along the coast in bays and estuaries (although seldom on open seashore). The species tends to roost and breed in trees (e.g. mangroves), but will also roost on sandy islands, cliffs, coral reefs and sand-dunes.

Nesting trees have many nests built close together. These nests are re-used every year until the trees collapse, although the birds will normally remain in the area. The species nests colonially in trees, reeds or low bushes along waterfronts as well as (less often) on the ground on sandy islands and in mangroves.

Its nest is a large heap of sticks and may be 10–50 m above the ground. The female lays two to three large white eggs and later the chicks feed by plunging their heads deep into the adult's pouch and taking the partially digested regurgitated fish.

Diet
Food is usually fish (of any size up to 450 g, usually in the 80-290 g range) and amphibians, and is usually obtained by fishing in groups. Among the fish preyed upon are cichlids like Haplochromis and Tilapia.

References

External links
Pink-backed Pelican Pelecanus rufescens at BirdLife International
Pinkbacked Pelican in The Atlas of Southern African Birds

Pelecanus
Birds of Madagascar
Birds of the Middle East
Birds of Africa
Birds of Sub-Saharan Africa
Birds described in 1789
Taxa named by Johann Friedrich Gmelin